Nico Steyn (born 12 April 2002) is a South African rugby union player for the  in the Currie Cup. His regular position is scrum-half. 

Steyn was named in the  side for the 2022 Currie Cup Premier Division.
Steyn made his URC debut against Leinster on 25 February 2022

Steyn made his U20 Junior Springboks debut against Argentina in 2021. Steyn was selected in 2022 to be part of the U20 Junior Springboks squad which won the Under 20 Six Nations Summer Series in the final against Wales.

References

South African rugby union players
Living people
Rugby union scrum-halves
Golden Lions players
2002 births
Lions (United Rugby Championship) players